Lincolnshire County Council is a non-metropolitan county in the East Midlands of England. It was formed when the Local Government Act 1972 merged the counties of Holland, Kesteven and Lindsey, and held its first election on 12 April 1973.

The Conservatives were the largest party, gaining 34 of the 74 seats. 22 independent candidates were returned, along with 10 Labour councillors, 5 Democratic-Labour nominees and 3 Liberals. The Democratic Labour seats were all won in Lincoln, where six weeks earlier the MP Dick Taverne had triggered a by-election by breaking away from Labour and forming the DLP; they comprised 5 of the 6 city seats, representing a swing from Labour, who had won all of the seats at the last local elections.

Results by Division

Candidates suffixed by an asterisk (*) are the winners in their seats, but the exact results of the poll are not included in the sources below.

Source: "Lincoln keeps up its Taverne revolution" and "The new Lincs Council". Lincolnshire Echo. 13 April 1973. p. 9; "Lincolnshire County Election Results 1973–2009". Elections Centre (Plymouth University). Retrieved 2 October 2016.

References

1973
1973 English local elections
1970s in Lincolnshire